Naked Ambition (literally "Wanton Emotions") is a 2003 Hong Kong sex comedy film directed by Chan Hing-ka and Dante Lam,  and starring Louis Koo (who also co-produced), Eason Chan and Josie Ho. Ho went on to win the Best Supporting Actress award at the 23rd Hong Kong Film Awards. Based on a true story the film is set in the world of Hong Kong's pornography and prostitution business. It was followed in 2014 by a sequel in name, Naked Ambition 2, however the two films share no characters or settings.

Plot
Andy (Louis Koo) and John (Eason Chan) are made redundant by their employer, a comic book publisher, and together with laid off colleagues go in search of a magazine publishing idea with which to make their fortunes. They ultimately stumble on the idea of a pornographic brothel guide; rather than unobtainable porn models their magazine features actual prostitutes working in the territory, together with an assessment of the girl and where she can be found. Their magazine, Ho Ching (豪情), is an unexpected hit and rakes in profits from both readers and working girls, as girls featured in the magazine see a jump in the number of punters and rates.

The visibility and money from this success leads to run ins with the law and organised crime, but what drives a wedge between Andy and John is their attitude to sexual temptation. Initially their write ups of their models are purely fictional, but the success of the magazine as an advertising tool leads to girls becoming willing to do whatever it takes in order to get a good review, and both Andy and John give in to the temptation of all the sex offered to them, damaging their relationships with girl friends and loved ones. Ultimately John manages to extract himself from the world of porn and prostitution, whilst Andy finds it impossible to leave.

The version released in Mainland China changes the focus of the film to law enforcement efforts to end the pornography industry. This version has a different title, The Inescapable Snare (天罗地网 Tiān​luó​dìwǎng). This version, in order to meet the standards of the ratio of employees for films jointly produced by Hong kong and Mainland China under the Mainland and Hong Kong Closer Economic Partnership Arrangement (CEPA), adds another character who is a female police officer from Mainland China who goes undercover.

Background
The film is based on real people and real events and the magazine Hao Qing is an actual one and is as it is depicted in the film. The character Andy is based on "Frankie" who appears in the end credits narrating a coda to the film.

Cast

Awards and nominations

References

External links

2000s sex comedy films
2003 films
2000s Cantonese-language films
Hong Kong sex comedy films
Films directed by Dante Lam
Films about prostitution in Hong Kong
Films about pornography
Films about adult magazine publishers (people)
Films set in Hong Kong
Films shot in Hong Kong
2003 comedy films
2000s Hong Kong films